The Reno Renegades were a short-lived American professional minor league ice hockey team based in Reno, Nevada. The team was a founding member of the West Coast Hockey League (WCHL).

History
The Renegades began play in the 1995–96 season in the WCHL. Although the Renegades never moved past the first round of the WCHL playoffs, the team achieved notoriety in 1996 by signing female goaltender Manon Rhéaume, who earlier in the decade played in preseason games for the NHL's Tampa Bay Lightning. Rhéaume appeared in 11 regular season games for the Renegades during the 1996–97 season.

In 1997, the team was renamed the Reno Rage, but folded after the 1997–98 season.

Possible return as an ECHL team
In 2000, the rights to the defunct Renegades/Rage organization were purchased by businessman Larry Leasure of Boise, Idaho. When the WCHL was absorbed by the ECHL in 2003, Leasure announced his intention to base the team in that league as the Reno Raiders. Although Leasure hoped to have the team operational by the 2007–08 season, he has been unable to secure an interest in a suitable arena in the Reno area. Leasure has said he would reassess his progress after the season.

Until 2016, Reno was listed on the ECHL's Future Markets page before it was removed. A new group called Reno Puck Club, LLC began negotiations with the city council to bring a new ECHL team to Reno, indicating that any new team will have no connections to the Renegades/Rage franchise.

Season-by-season record 
Note: GP = Games played, W = Wins, L = Losses, OTL = Overtime losses, SOL = Shootout losses, Pts = Points, GF = Goals for, GA = Goals against, PIM = Penalties in minutes

Final records.

Logos

References

Ice hockey teams in Nevada
Sports in Reno, Nevada
West Coast Hockey League teams
1995 establishments in Nevada
Ice hockey clubs established in 1995
1998 disestablishments in Nevada
Sports clubs disestablished in 1998